Jesús Domínguez (27 January 1926 – 24 March 2003) was a Spanish freestyle swimmer. He competed in three events at the 1948 Summer Olympics.

References

External links
 

1926 births
2003 deaths
Spanish male freestyle swimmers
Olympic swimmers of Spain
Swimmers at the 1948 Summer Olympics
Sportspeople from Santa Cruz de Tenerife
Swimmers at the 1955 Mediterranean Games